Trio Mediæval is a vocal trio established in 1997 in Oslo, mainly to sing medieval polyphonic works. Its members are Anna Maria Friman (from Sweden) and Linn Andrea Fuglseth and Torunn Østrem Ossum (from Norway). 

The trio's debut album, Words of the Angel, charted in the Top Ten of the Billboard Classical list. In 2009 the group received a nomination for Best Chamber Music Performance Grammy Award for the album Folk Songs.

Collaborations
Since its early career, the trio has expanded its repertoire to contemporary compositions such as those of Gavin Bryars and Ivan Moody. The title track on the group's album, Words of the Angel (2001), was a Moody work.

The three singers have worked closely with English tenor and vocal ensemble specialist John Potter. On the 2014 album Aquilonis, Torunn Østrem Ossum was unable to participate, so Friman and Fuglseth recruited Berit Opheim as her substitute.

ECM label recording artists, the trio often tours Europe and the United States.

Discography
2001: Words of the Angel
2004: Soir, dit Elle
2005: Stella Maris
2007: Folk Songs
2011: A Worcester Ladymass
2014: Aquilonis
2017: Rimur
2011: Solacium

See also
Andrew Smith (composer)

References

External links
Official website
Classical Archives Interview with soprano Linn Andrea Fuglseth

Early music choirs
ECM Records artists
Musical groups established in 1997
1997 establishments in Sweden